Bala Pap Kiadeh (also Romanized as Bālā Pāp Kīādeh; also known as Balamahalleh-ye Papiyadeh) is a village in Chaf Rural District, in the Central District of Langarud County, Gilan Province, Iran. At the 2006 census, its population was 522, in 170 families.

References 

Populated places in Langarud County